Nelly Olin was a Minister of Environment in France under Dominique de Villepin's government. From 2004 to 2005, Olin was the Minister-Delegate for Social Security. She was a Senator for Val-d'Oise.

References

1941 births
2017 deaths
21st-century French women politicians
Chevaliers of the Légion d'honneur
French Ministers of the Environment
French Senators of the Fifth Republic
Politicians from Paris
Senators of Val-d'Oise
Women government ministers of France
Women members of the Senate (France)